Castejón may refer to:

 Castejón, Navarre, a municipality in Navarre, Spain
 Castejón, Cuenca, a municipality in the province of Cuenca, Castile-La Mancha, Spain
 Castejón de Alarba, a municipality in the province of Zaragoza, Aragón, Spain
 Castejón de las Armas, a municipality in the province of Zaragoza, Aragón, Spain
 Castejón de Henares, a municipality in the province of Guadalajara, Castile-La Mancha, Spain
 Castejón de Monegros, a municipality in the province of Huesca, Aragón, Spain
 Castejón del Puente, a municipality in the province of Huesca, Aragón, Spain
 Castejón de Sos, a municipality in the province of Huesca, Aragón, Spain
 Castejón de Tornos, a municipality in the province of Teruel, Aragón, Spain
 Castejón de Valdejasa, a municipality in the province of Zaragoza, Aragón, Spain
 Castejón Mountains, in Aragon, Spain
 Sierra de Castejón, in La Rioja, Spain